Heart of a Child is a 1958 British drama film adapted from the 1940 novel of the same title by Phyllis Bottome, directed by Clive Donner. It stars Jean Anderson and Donald Pleasence.

Plot
During wartime rationing, Karl, a young Austrian boy, is beaten by his father, Spiel, who threatens to sell the boy's St. Bernard dog to the butcher to pay for food for the family. However, much to the father's fury, Karl sells the dog himself to a kindly veterinarian. The dog, with the help of Maria, a spinster, then rescues Karl after he is trapped in a snowstorm. Maria ends up marrying the vet, and Karl's father ends up letting Karl keep the dog.

Cast
 Jean Anderson as Maria
 Donald Pleasence as Spiel
 Richard Williams as Karl
 Carla Challoner as Elsa
 Maureen Pryor as Frau Spiel
 Norman Macowan as Heiss
 John Glyn-Jones as Priest 
 Willoughby Goddard as Stott 
 Andrew Keir as Constable
 John Boxer as Breuer

Production
It was the second feature film directed by Clive Donner, who had turned down two films after his debut The Secret Place. He says they reshot the ending twice at the request of Earl St John who was dissatisfied with it. Then Sydney Box wrote another ending and that was used. Donner said the film "was not a happy experience" even though there was location work in Austria.

Reception
Donner said "I don't think it did as great business as it could have done because sentimentality of that sort is something I wasn't right for and I think I was fighting it. If I'd really gone for broke I think I would've done big, big business."

References

External links

1958 films
Films directed by Clive Donner
Films shot at Pinewood Studios
British drama films
1958 drama films
1950s English-language films
1950s British films